Clover is a genus of small, trifoliate plants.

Clover may also refer to:

Places
United States
 Clover, Ohio, an unincorporated community
 Clover, South Carolina, a town in York County
 Clover, Virginia, a place in Halifax County
 Clover, West Virginia (disambiguation)
 Clover, Wisconsin, a town
 Clover, Manitowoc County, Wisconsin, an unincorporated community

Rivers
United States
 Clover Creek (Pennsylvania), a tributary of the Frankstown Branch Juniata River
 Clover Creek (Washington), a stream in Washington State

Music
 Clover Records, a record label
 Clover (band), a 1967–1978 American country rock band
 Clover (album) by Clover, 1970
 Clover (musical trio), a South Korean hip hop group
 The Clovers, an American R&B vocal group
 "Clover", a song by Sifow from Clarity, 2006
 "Clover", a song by Xiu Xiu from La Forêt, 2005

Entertainment and fiction
 Clover (Clamp manga), 1997–1999
 Clover (Tetsuhiro Hirakawa manga), 2007–2015
 Clover (Toriko Chiya manga), 1997–2010
 Clover (2014 film), a Japanese live-action drama based on Toriko Chiya's manga
 Clover, a 1990 novel by Dori Sanders
 Clover (1997 film), an American television film based on Dori Sanders's novel
 Clover (2020 film), an American film by Jon Abrahams

Characters 
 Clover (creature), from the Cloverfield film series
 Clover, a character from the novel Animal Farm
 Clover, a principal character in the Hillsover series of books by Susan Coolidge
 Clover, a common rabbit from the children's animated television series Sofia the First
 Clover, a main character from the Canadian-French animated television show Totally Spies!
 Clover, a recurring character in the Zero Escape video game series

Companies and products
 Clover (mobile app), a mobile dating app
 Clover (toy company), a Japanese toy company
 Clover Studio, a defunct game developer
 Clover (spread), a brand of dairy spread in the United Kingdom
 Clover (dairy), a South African dairy company
 Clover Stornetta Farms, a dairy company based in Sonoma County, California
 Clover Discount Store, a defunct discount department store
 Clover Equipment Company, a company that manufactures coffee equipment
 Clover (Pillow Pal), a Pillow Pal bunny made by Ty, Inc.
 Clover Network, a point of sale hardware technology company based in Sunnyvale, California and now owned by Fiserv
 Clover Food Lab, a vegetarian fast food and food truck company based in Boston, MA

Science and computing
 Clover (detector), a gamma ray detector
 Clover (telescope)
 Clover, the ⌘ command key on Apple computer keyboards
 Clover (software), a Java code coverage analysis tool from Atlassian, Inc.
 CLOVER2000, a family of modulation techniques

People with the given name
 Clover (given name)

People with the surname
 Clover (surname)

Politics
 The Clover, a former alliance of political parties in Italy